Guildwood GO Station is a GO Transit train station in Toronto, Ontario, Canada. It is located on Kingston Road in the Guildwood neighbourhood of the district of Scarborough. The station is situated on the CN Kingston Subdivision. It is a stop on the Lakeshore East line and also for intercity Via Rail Corridor services running from Toronto to Ottawa and Montreal.

History
The station was opened on April 4, 1967, by the Canadian National Railway, with GO Transit following a month later. Intercity services passed to Via Rail in 1979.

The station was meant to provide an easy connection to Toronto Transit Commission buses along Kingston Road, as well as car parking. Since the commuter train service was initially only a demonstration, the land close to the overpass, and the bus stop, could not be acquired due to the cost. This resulted in quite a long walk for pedestrians using local transit.

The station has long served as (Metro) Toronto's secondary intercity rail station, providing a second option for Via riders traveling through Toronto alongside the busier Toronto Union Station.

In May 2018, both platforms were closed at the west end for constructing more tunnels on the west platform, and further station building upgrades. GO Trains only opened the five east-end coaches of each train. Construction was completed on July 3, 2019.

Connecting transit
Bus route 86 Scarborough and all of its branch routes, operated by the Toronto Transit Commission (TTC), stop on Kingston Road and Celeste Drive, the intersection closest to the station. The route operates between Kennedy station on Line 2 Bloor–Danforth and the Toronto Zoo. The station is also served by the 12D Kingston Road bus, a local bus route that operates rush hours only between Victoria Park station on Line 2 and the University of Toronto Scarborough, the 905 Eglinton East Express, an express bus route that terminates at the University of Toronto Scarborough and the 986 Scarborough Express, an express bus route that terminates at the Meadowvale Loop.

References

External links

Guildwood GO Station construction at GO Transit

GO Transit railway stations
Via Rail stations in Ontario
Railway stations in Toronto
Transport in Scarborough, Toronto
Railway stations in Canada opened in 1967
Canadian National Railway stations in Ontario
1967 establishments in Ontario